Fong Sai-yuk (a.k.a. The Legend of Fong Sai-yuk or simply The Legend; released in the Philippines as The Prodigal Fighter) is a 1993 Hong Kong action-comedy film directed by Corey Yuen and produced by Jet Li, who stars as Chinese folk hero Fong Sai-yuk. The film won the Hong Kong Film Award and Golden Horse Award for best action choreography. The film received positive reviews, particularly praising Josephine Siao's acting and the action choreography. The film had a sequel, Fong Sai-yuk II, released later the same year in 1993.

Plot
The brash and ambitious Fong Sai-yuk meets the beautiful Lui Ting-ting during a track and field competition and falls in love with her. Ting-ting is the daughter of Tiger Lui, a hot-headed hooligan. Lui stages a martial arts competition for interested men to participate and win his daughter's hand in marriage. The contestant must defeat Lui's wife, Siu-wan, in order to win. Fong joins the contest at his friends' urging and defeats Siu-wan. He catches a glimpse of his future bride, who is actually a servant to replace Ting-ting, who had gone missing during the contest. Fong decides to forfeit the match and leaves.

Fong's mother, Miu Tsui-fa, enters the contest in disguise as a man to help her son regain his lost pride. She defeats Siu-wan by knocking her off the scaffold, but catches her as she falls and they land safely on the ground. After that intimate moment together, Siu-wan becomes romantically attracted to Miu without knowing that Miu is actually a woman in disguise. Lui then forces Miu to marry his daughter. To save his mother from embarrassment, Fong marries Ting-ting on behalf of his "brother" (his mother in disguise as a man), and is confined in his father-in-law's house. He is unaware that his bride is actually his love interest and they fight in the dark. They discover each other's identities eventually.

Miu manages to persuade Lui to let her son return home. Just then, Fong's father, Fong Tak, returns home from a trip. Fong discovers that his father is a member of the Red Flower Society, a secret society seeking to overthrow the ruling Qing dynasty. While Fong Tak is having a conversation with fellow members, they are ambushed by the Governor of Nine Gates and his soldiers. The Governor demands that Fong Tak hand over the name list of the society's members, but he refuses. Just then, Fong Sai-yuk and his mother show up, and Fong fights with the Governor and holds him off until his parents have escaped.

Fong and his parents hide in their in-laws' house to evade the authorities, but the Governor visits Lui's house and recognises them. In the ensuing fight, Fong Tak is captured while Siu-wan dies from a gunshot wound. The Governor stages a public execution of Fong Tak to lure Fong Sai-yuk into a trap. Fong lies to his mother that his father has been rescued and decides to save his father alone without letting her know. He attempts to storm the execution ground and fights with the Governor to save his father. At the critical moment, Miu appears with the Red Flower Society's members and their leader, Chan Ka-lok. They defeat the Governor and his men and succeed in freeing Fong Tak. In the end, Fong Sai-yuk becomes Chan's godson and joins his godfather on their quest as they ride towards the horizon.

Cast

Sources:

Jet Li as Fong Sai-yuk
Josephine Siao as Miu Tsui-fa
Vincent Zhao as the Governor of Nine Gates
Michelle Reis as Lui Ting-ting
Paul Chu as Fong Tak
Sibelle Hu as Siu-wan
Chen Sung-young as Lui Lo-fu (Tiger Lui)
Adam Cheng as Chan Ka-lok

Release
Fong Sai-yuk was a box office hit on Hong Kong, grossing HK $30,666,842. In the Philippines, the film was released as The Prodigal Fighter by Viking Films on December 2, 1993. A sequel, Fong Sai-yuk II, was released in the same year.

Home media 
In the United Kingdom, the film (released as Jet Li's The Legend) was watched by  viewers on television in 2004, making it the year's tenth most-watched foreign-language film on television (below nine other Hong Kong action films). Fong Sai-yuk II (released as The Legend II) drew  UK viewers the same year, adding up to a combined  UK viewership for both films in 2004.

Reception
In Hong Kong, Corey Yuen and Yuen Tak won the Hong Kong Film Award for Best Action Choreography at the 13th Hong Kong Film Awards. Josephine Siao and Zhang Yao-zong were nominated for best actress and best editing respectively as well. At the 1993 Golden Horse Awards, Peter Cheung won the award for Best Editing, while Corey Yuen and Yuen Tak won the award for best action choreography.

The film received a positive review from Time Out London who referred to the script as "cobbled together", but praised actress Josephine Siao, noting "a show-stopping culmination of three decades of fine work in the Hong Kong cinema". The Austin Chronicle praised the film's fight choreography as the "most breathtakingly choreographed fight scenes witnessed in years", and noted the liberated female characters, calling them "a refreshing change of pace from years past, when women were frequently used as either cookie cutter stereotypes or the requisite damsels in distress". TV Guide gave the film four stars, praising both Siao and Jet Li's roles and Corey Yuen's direction stating "it's astonishing to find that the director also helmed the ridiculous Stateside kung fu fest No Retreat, No Surrender (1986), Jean-Claude Van Damme's film debut; on home ground, he proves a filmmaker of consummate skill and style".

In 2014, Time Out polled several film critics, directors, actors and stunt actors to list their top action films. Fong Sai-yuk was listed at 84th place on this list under its title The Legend.

See also
Jet Li filmography
List of Hong Kong films of 1993

References

External links

1993 films
1993 action comedy films
1993 martial arts films
1990s Cantonese-language films
Films directed by Corey Yuen
Films set in 18th-century Qing dynasty
Hong Kong action comedy films
Hong Kong martial arts comedy films
Kung fu films
Wuxia films
1990s Hong Kong films